The Men's 110 metres hurdles at the 2010 Commonwealth Games as part of the athletics programme was held at the Jawaharlal Nehru Stadium on Friday 8 October 2010.

The top three runners in each of the initial two heats automatically qualified for the final alongside the two fastest athletes.

Records

Round 1
First 3 in each heat (Q) and 2 best performers (q) advance to the Final.

Heat 1

Heat 2

Final

External links
2010 Commonwealth Games - Athletics

Men's 110 metres hurdles
2010